Matt Dunford (born 4 March 1968) is an Australian former professional rugby league footballer who played in the 1990s.  Dunford played for Manly-Warringah in the NSWRL, and the ARL and London Broncos in the Super League.

Playing career
Dunford made his first grade debut for Manly-Warringah in round 1 1990 against Balmain at Leichhardt Oval.  In the same year, Dunford played in Manly's minor semi-final loss against the Brisbane Broncos.

In 1991, Dunford played 21 games for Manly including both of their finals matches which ended in defeat.  Dunford subsequently played for Manly in their 1994 finals campaign where they were once again defeated by Brisbane.

In the 1995 ARL season, Dunford played 9 games for Manly as the club won the minor premiership losing only twice in the process but did not feature in their finals campaign or grand final loss to Canterbury.  In the 1996 ARL season, Dunford only featured in 2 games for Manly as they won the minor premiership for a second consecutive year.  

In 1997, Dunford signed for English side the London Broncos and played two seasons with them before retiring.

References

1968 births
Place of birth missing (living people)
Living people
London Broncos players
Manly Warringah Sea Eagles players
Rugby league hookers
Rugby league locks
Rugby league second-rows